William Loughnane (5 August 1915 – 18 October 1982) was an Irish Fianna Fáil politician.

Biography
He was born 5 August 1915 in Feakle, County Clare, son of Willie Loughnane, a farmer and shopkeeper, and Kate Loughnane (née McInerney). He was educated at Feakle national school; St Flannan's College, Ennis; CBS Limerick; and University College Dublin (UCD), where he studied medicine. In 1938, while at UCD, he won an All-Ireland Senior Hurling Championship with Dublin.

He was elected to Dáil Éireann as a Fianna Fáil Teachta Dála (TD) for the Clare–South Galway constituency at the 1969 general election. He was re-elected at the 1973 general election for the same constituency. He was elected for the Galway West constituency (which at that time surrounded Galway Bay to include North Clare) at the 1977 general election, and was elected for the Clare constituency at the 1981 and February 1982 general elections. He died in October 1982 shortly before the November 1982 general election.

He was a noted Republican backbencher within Fianna Fáil. He and Síle de Valera were highly critical of the then Taoiseach Jack Lynch, criticism which precipitated Lynch's resignation in 1979. He was also a supporter of the Anti H-Block movement.

Before his election as a TD, and for a while after, he played the fiddle with The Tulla Céilí Band.

References

1915 births
1982 deaths
Fianna Fáil TDs
Members of the 19th Dáil
Members of the 20th Dáil
Members of the 21st Dáil
Members of the 22nd Dáil
Members of the 23rd Dáil
Politicians from County Clare
Politicians from County Galway
20th-century Irish medical doctors
People educated at St Flannan's College
Alumni of University College Dublin